Palace Lady Gim was a Korean concubine to the King Gwangjong of Goryeo. As a royal consort, she was given the title of Worthy Consort (현비, 賢妃) in 1029.

References

Royal consorts of the Goryeo Dynasty
Year of birth unknown
Year of death unknown